Interstate 87 may refer to either of two unconnected Interstate Highways in the United States:

 Interstate 87 (New York), a highway running from New York City north to the Canadian border in Champlain, New York.
 Interstate 87 (North Carolina), a highway presently running from Raleigh, North Carolina, east to Wendell, North Carolina, that is planned to extend northeast toward Norfolk, Virginia.

87